Henry Heron may refer to:

Henry Heron (soldier), of Elizabethan Ireland
Henry Heron (MP) (1675–1730), member of parliament for Boston and Lincolnshire
Henry Heron of the Heron baronets

See also
Heron (disambiguation)